Agardy (Ağarźı) is a rural locality (a selo) in Tanovsky Selsoviet, Blagovarsky District, Bashkortostan, Russia. The population was 221 as of 2010. There are 3 streets.

Geography 
Agardy is located 23 km north of Yazykovo (the district's administrative centre) by road. Novy Syntash is the nearest rural locality.

References 

Rural localities in Blagovarsky District